Sarah Game is an Australian politician. She has been a member of the South Australian Legislative Council since the 2022 state election, representing Pauline Hanson's One Nation.

Before parliament
Before her election in 2022, Game had been a veterinarian in a practice at South Brighton, a coastal suburb of Adelaide, since July 2021, using the name Sarah Wareing. She completed a Bachelor of Veterinary Science in 2006 at the University of Sydney in 2006 and lived in the United Kingdom for the next ten years, working as a biology teacher. She was One Nation's first member of the South Australian parliament. She described herself as a "hard-working single mum of three children".

Game lived in the UK from 2006 until 2016 where she worked in a teaching capacity.

Personal life and views
Game grew up in a "separated family" in Sydney. At the time of her election in 2022, she had three children aged 7, 6 and 4, and was raising them as a single parent.

Game does not support banning of foreign language teaching in schools (which had been a One Nation policy before the election), and she does not hold to strict interpretations of complex personal issues relating to abortion and transgender issues. She has Jewish heritage and was confirmed Catholic, but does not regard herself as religious, and chose to use the affirmation rather than religious oath at her swearing in to office. She has a strong focus on providing the best available education to all students regardless of their background, drawn from her own experience.

In her inaugural speech to state parliament she declared her support for "sustainable, cohesive immigration to Australia". David Ettridge, a founding member of One Nation, responded by claiming that Game held "Greens values" that could prompt a split from the party, adding "this is not what One Nation voters voted for".

Game has expressed her opposition to legislation that would establish an "indigenous voice to parliament" in South Australia, saying it would divide South Australians based on race, and that One Nation wants "real tangible benefits for all disadvantaged Australians".

Game's father Robert Game died on 2 February 2023 via suicide, following this, Game has voiced support for increased access to mental health resources particularly in regional South Australia.

References

Living people
Year of birth missing (living people)
Members of the South Australian Legislative Council
Women members of the South Australian Legislative Council
21st-century Australian politicians
21st-century Australian women politicians
Australian veterinarians
Women veterinarians
Pauline Hanson's One Nation politicians
Jewish Australian politicians